John Link may refer to:

 John Link (composer), American composer
 John "Jack" Link, founder of Jack Link's Beef Jerky
 John F. Link Sr. (1901–1968), American firm director and editor 
 John F. Link, son of John F. Link Sr., American film editor
 John Gustave Link, an architect in Montana, United States, who was a partner in Link & Haire